Fathabad (also Romanized as Fatḩābād) is a village in Pishva Rural District, in the Central District of Pishva County, Tehran Province, Iran. At the 2006 census, its population was 23, in 7 families.

References 

Populated places in Pishva County